This is a list of main career statistics of Russian professional tennis player Daniil Medvedev. All statistics are according to the ATP Tour and ITF websites.

Performance timelines

Singles
Current through the 2023 Indian Wells Masters.

Doubles

Significant finals

Grand Slam finals

Singles: 4 (1 title, 3 runner-ups)

Year-end championships

Singles: 2 (1 title, 1 runner-up)

ATP Masters 1000 finals

Singles: 7 (4 titles, 3 runner-ups)

ATP career finals

Singles: 31 (18 titles, 13 runner-ups)

Futures and Challenger finals

Singles: 6 (5 titles, 1 runner-up)

Doubles: 10 (4 titles, 6 runner-ups)

ATP ranking

Daniil Medevdev has spent in total 16 weeks as ATP world No. 1.

*.

Record against other players

Record against top-10 players

Medvedev's record against those who have been ranked in the top 10, with active players in boldface.

Record against players ranked No. 11–20

Active players are in boldface. 

 Alex de Minaur 4–1
 Reilly Opelka 4–1
 Benoît Paire 3–0
 Sam Querrey 2–0
 Albert Ramos Viñolas 2–0
 Cristian Garín 2–1
 Kyle Edmund 2–2
 Nikoloz Basilashvili 1–0
 Viktor Troicki 1–0
 Aslan Karatsev 1–1
 Philipp Kohlschreiber 1–1
 Feliciano López 1–1
 Andreas Seppi 1–1
 Borna Ćorić 3–4
 Nick Kyrgios 1–4
 Alexandr Dolgopolov 0–1
 Ivo Karlović 0–1
 Chung Hyeon 0–2
 Guido Pella 0–2

*

Wins over top 10 players  
He has a  record against players who were, at the time the match was played, ranked in the top 10.

Grand Slam seedings
The tournaments won by Medvedev are in bold.

*

National and international participation

Team competitions finals: 3 (3 titles)

Davis Cup (3–3)

   indicates the outcome of the Davis Cup match followed by the score, date, place of event, the zonal classification and its phase, and the court surface.

ATP Cup (9–2)

Laver Cup (1–0)

Longest winning streaks

20 match win streak (2020–21)

19 match win streak (2023)

ATP Tour career earnings

* Statistics correct .

Exhibition finals

Singles

See also

List of ATP number 1 ranked singles tennis players
List of highest ranked tennis players per country
Russia Davis Cup team
Sport in Russia

Notes

References

External links
 
 
 

Medvedev, Daniil
Sport in Russia